The 2019–20 Aston Villa W.F.C. season was the club's 24th season under their current Aston Villa affiliation and the organisation's 47th overall season in existence. It was their sixth consecutive full season in the FA Women's Championship, formerly the FA WSL 2. Along with competing in the Championship, the club also contested two domestic cup competitions: the FA Cup and the League Cup.

On 13 March 2020, in line with the FA's response to the coronavirus pandemic, it was announced the season was temporarily suspended until at least 3 April 2020. After further postponements, the season was ultimately ended prematurely on 25 May 2020 with immediate effect. Aston Villa sat six points clear at the top of the table at the time and were awarded the Championship title and promoted on sporting merit after The FA Board's decision to award places on a points-per-game basis.

Current squad

FA Women's Championship

Results summary

Matches

League table

Women's FA Cup

As a member of the top two tiers, Aston Villa entered the FA Cup in the fourth round, losing to FA WSL team Brighton & Hove Albion in their opening fixture.

FA Women's League Cup

Group stage

Knockout phase

Squad statistics

Appearances 

Starting appearances are listed first, followed by substitute appearances after the + symbol where applicable.

|-
|colspan="14"|Players away from the club on loan:

|}

Goalscorers

Transfers

Transfers in

Transfers out

Loans out

Notes

External links 
 AVFC Women official website

Aston Villa W.F.C. seasons
Aston Villa